Lula is a village and municipality in the Levice District in the Nitra Region of Slovakia.

History
In historical records the village was first mentioned in 1226.

Geography
The village lies at an altitude of 180 metres and covers an area of 8.388 km². It has a population of about 200 people.

Ethnicity
The village is approximately 98% Slovak and 2% Magyar

Facilities
The village has a public library and football pitch.

External links
https://web.archive.org/web/20070427022352/http://www.statistics.sk/mosmis/eng/run.html

Villages and municipalities in Levice District